Mohamed Lamine Ould Ahmed (born 1947) is a Sahrawi politician, writer and member of the Polisario Front.

Since January 2012, he is the Minister of Health of the Sahrawi Republic.

Born in Smara and being one of the founding members of the POLISARIO, Mohamed Lamine Ould Ahmed became the first Prime Minister of the Sahrawi Arab Democratic Republic (SADR) in 1976, and held the post until 1982. He returned to office in 1985–88 and has been a member of the National Secretariat of the Polisario since. According to Amnesty International, 11 of his family members have been "disappeared" by Moroccan security personnel for political reasons.

References

External links
 Souvenence (Recollections) by Mohamed Lamine Ould Ahmed 

Prime Ministers of the Sahrawi Arab Democratic Republic
Health ministers of the Sahrawi Arab Democratic Republic
Sahrawi Sunni Muslims
Living people
People from Smara
Polisario Front politicians
1947 births
Sahrawi non-fiction writers